Pyar Ka Pehla Naam: Radha Mohan ( The First Name of Love: Radha Mohan) is an Indian Hindi language Supernatural romantic drama television series. Produced by Prateek Sharma under Studio LSD Private Limited. It premiered on 2 May 2022 on Zee TV and digitally streams on ZEE5. It is the official remake of Zee Tamil's series Yaaradi Nee Mohini. It stars Shabir Ahluwalia as Mohan and Niharika Roy as Radha.

Plot
Mohan's first wife dies and his daughter Gungun considers him to be her mother's murderer while Radha is in love with Mohan and considers him as her inspiration. Mohan's first wife Tulsi's soul has not got salvation and she is wandering in his house and protects her daughter Gungun at every turn. Mohan's stepmother Kadambari wants to remarry him and she chooses her niece Damini to marry Mohan but Damini wants to marry Mohan for his wealth. Mohan agrees to marry Damini for the sake of his mother. Meanwhile, Radha saves Gungun's life and Radha stays at Mohan's house as a guest.

Radha and Mohan start coming closer which makes Damini jealous. Kadambari and Damini learn about Tulsi's soul and they both try to imprison her with the help of Gurumaa but all efforts go in vain. Later, Gungun and Radha become good friends. In order to get Radha out of the house, Damini accuses her of theft but Radha proves herself innocent.

Cast

Main 
 Shabir Ahluwalia as Mohan Trivedi – Vishwanath's son; Kadambari's step-son; Ketki and Rahul's elder half-brother; Tulsi's widower; Gungun's father; Damini's ex-fiance; Radha's childhood best friend turned husband.
 Neeharika Roy as Radha Trivedi (nee Vashisht) – Rameshwar's daughter; Sundari's granddaughter; Mohan's childhood bestfriend turned wife; Gungun's step-mother.

Recurring 
 Keerti Nagpure as Tulsi Mohan Trivedi – Narmada's daughter; Mohan's first (late) wife; Gungun's mother (Dead/Ghost)
 Reeza Choudhary as Gungun Trivedi – Mohan and Tulsi's daughter; Radha's step-daughter; Vishwanath's granddaughter; Kadambari's step-granddaughter; Rahul and Ketki's niece
 Swati Shah as Kadambari Trivedi – Kaveri and Kulbhushan's younger sister; Vishwanath's second wife; Ketki and Rahul's mother; Mohan's step-mother; Radha's step-mother-in-law; Damini's maternal aunt; Gungun's step-grandmother.
 Sambhabana Mohanty as Damini – Kaveri's daughter; Rahul and Ketki's cousin; Kulbhushan and Kadambari's niece; Mohan's ex-fiancee.
 Manisha Purohit as Kaveri – Kulbhushan and Kadambari's elder sister; Rahul and Ketki's aunt; Damini's mother.
 Rajendra Lodhia as Vishwanath Trivedi – Kadambari's husband; Kaveri and Kulbhushan's brother-in-law; Mohan, Ketki and Rahul's father; Radha's father-in-law; Gungun's grandfather.
 Pooja Kawa as Ketki (née Trivedi) – Kadambari and Vishwanath's daughter; Rahul's younger sister; Kulbhushan's niece; Mohan's younger half-sister; Ajeet's wife; Gungun's aunt.
 Sumeet Arora as Ajeet – Ketki's husband; Vishwanath and Kadambari's son-in-law; Rahul's brother-in-law.
 Ranveer Singh Malik as Rahul Trivedi – Kadambari and Vishwanath's son; Ketki's elder brother; Kulbhushan's nephew; Ajeet's brother-in-law; Mohan's younger half-brother; Gungun's uncle.
 Adi Irani as Kulbhushan - Kaveri's younger brother; Kadambari's elder brother; Mohan's step-uncle; Rahul and Ketki's uncle.
 Brijkishore Tiwari as Rameshwar Vashisht – Sundari's son; Radha's father; Mohan's father-in-law.
 Kajal Khanchandani as Sundari Vashisht – Rameshwar's mother; Radha's grandmother; Mohan's grandmother-in-law.
 Sunny Sachdev as Advocate Shekhar – Mohan's childhood friend and lawyer.

Production

Development
In 2022 Zee TV planned an official Hindi remake of Zee Tamil's Tamil Language series Yaaradi Nee Mohini to be produced by Prateek Sharma. It is the second Hindi remake after Main Bhi Ardhangini, which aired on &TV from 21 January 2019 to 1 November 2019.  The shooting of the series began in April 2022.

Release
The first promo was released on April 2022 featuring Shabir Ahluwalia and Niharika Roy.

See also 
List of programmes broadcast by Zee TV

References

External links 
 Pyar Ka Pehla Naam: Radha Mohan at ZEE5
 

2022 Indian television series debuts
Zee TV original programming
Indian drama television series
Hindi-language television shows
Hindi-language television series based on Tamil-language television series